is a Japanese politician who served as the Minister of Land, Infrastructure, Transport and Tourism from September 2019 to October 2021. He is also a member of the House of Representatives, representing the Hyogo 2nd district since 2012. A member of the Komeito Party, he was elected to the House of Representatives for the first time in 1993. He served as a representative until 2009, ending when he lost his re-election bid. In 2012, he ran again and successfully won back the seat.

References

External links 
 

Members of the House of Representatives (Japan)
Keio University alumni
Politicians from Tokyo
Living people
1958 births
New Komeito politicians
21st-century Japanese politicians
Ministers of Land, Infrastructure, Transport and Tourism of Japan